The  was held on 12 February 1989 in Kannai Hall, Yokohama, Kanagawa, Japan.

Awards
 Best Film: Rock yo shizukani nagareyo
 Best New Actor: Otokogumi (Shoji Narita, Kazuya Takahashi, Kenichi Okamoto, and Koyo Maeda) – Rock yo shizukani nagareyo
 Best Actor: Hiroyuki Sanada – Kaitō Ruby
 Best Actress: Kyōko Koizumi – Kaitō Ruby
 Best New Actress: Yukari Tachibana – Neko no Yōni
 Best Supporting Actor: Tsurutarō Kataoka – The Discarnates
 Best Supporting Actress: Shuko Honami – Ureshi Hazukashi Monogatari
 Best Director:
Shūsuke Kaneko – Summer Vacation 1999, Last Cabaret
Shunichi Nagasaki – Rock yo shizukani nagareyo
 Best New Director: Koji Enokido – Futari Botchi
 Best Screenplay: Shoichi Maruyama – Futari Botchi, Love Story o Kimini
 Best Cinematography: Kenji Takama – Summer Vacation 1999

Best 10
 Rock yo shizukani nagareyo
 My Neighbor Totoro
 Futari Botchi
 The Discarnates
 Revolver
 Kaitō Ruby
 Kono Mune no Tokimeki wo
 Summer Vacation 1999
 Last Cabaret
 Grave of the Fireflies
runner-up. Kaisha monogatari: Memories of You
runner-up. So What

References

Yokohama Film Festival
Yokohama Film Festival
Yokohama Film Festival
Yokohama Film Festival